The Heart Within is a 1957 British drama film directed by David Eady and starring James Hayter, Clifford Evans and David Hemmings. Its plot involves a Jamaican dockside worker who goes on the run in London suspected of the murder of another Jamaican.

Cast
 James Hayter - Grandfather Willard
 Clifford Evans - Matthew Johnson
 David Hemmings - Danny Willard
 Earl Cameron - Victor Conway
 Dan Jackson - Joe Martell
 Jack Stewart - Inspector Matheson
 Betty Cooper - Miss Trevor
 Gloria Ann Simpson - Violet
 Frank Singuineau - Bobo
 Pauline Henriques - Ella
 Janice Hughes - Dilli
 Denton De Gray - Gow
 Wally Thomas - Sergeant
 Glynn Edwards - 1st Constable
 Ivor Salter - 2nd Constable
 Frank Pettitt - 3rd Constable
 'The Kings of the Caribbean' steel band - Musicians

Critical reception
The Monthly Film Bulletin wrote "With some good camerawork, a London docks setting, and cautious but not unenterprising use of its West Indian characters, this film has a more convincing air than most thrillers of its type. Unfortunately, the effect is somewhat handicapped by an over-melodramatic and stereotyped climax and by some indifferent playing. Earl Cameron and David Hemmings play agreeably, though, as the West Indian and the cockney boy who befriends him. Background music is effectively provided by a West Indian steel band." TV Guide wrote "Well-acted presentation of a man accused of murder because of the color of his skin...Intriguing effort given power mainly through the handling of the theme of prejudice."

References

External links

1957 films
1957 drama films
Films directed by David Eady
British drama films
Films set in London
1950s English-language films
1950s British films